Elections to Moyle District Council were held on 18 May 1977 on the same day as the other Northern Irish local government elections. The election used three district electoral areas to elect a total of 16 councillors.

Election results

Note: "Votes" are the first preference votes.

Districts summary

|- class="unsortable" align="centre"
!rowspan=2 align="left"|Ward
! % 
!Cllrs
! % 
!Cllrs
! %
!Cllrs
! %
!Cllrs
!rowspan=2|TotalCllrs
|- class="unsortable" align="center"
!colspan=2 bgcolor="" | SDLP
!colspan=2 bgcolor="" | UUP
!colspan=2 bgcolor="" | DUP
!colspan=2 bgcolor="white"| Others
|-
|align="left"|Area A
|30.4
|1
|0.0
|0
|0.0
|0
|bgcolor="#DDDDDD"|69.6
|bgcolor="#DDDDDD"|3
|4
|-
|align="left"|Area B
|0.0
|0
|30.5
|2
|18.3
|2
|bgcolor="#0077FF"|51.2
|bgcolor="#0077FF"|4
|8
|-
|align="left"|Area C
|bgcolor="#99FF66"|51.9
|bgcolor="#99FF66"|2
|19.7
|1
|0.0
|0
|28.4
|1
|4
|-
|- class="unsortable" class="sortbottom" style="background:#C9C9C9"
|align="left"| Total
|22.6
|3
|17.6
|3
|7.7
|2
|52.1
|8
|16
|-
|}

Districts results

Area A

1973: 4 x Independent
1977: 3 x Independent, 1 x SDLP
1973-1977 Change: SDLP gain from Independent

Area B

1973: 4 x UUP, 2 x Independent Unionist, 2 x Independent
1977: 2 x UUP, 2 x DUP, 2 x Independent Unionist, 2 x Independent
1973-1977 Change: DUP (two seats) gain from UUP (two seats)

Area C

1973: 2 x SDLP, 1 x UUP, 1 x Independent
1977: 2 x SDLP, 1 x UUP, 1 x Independent
1973-1977 Change: No change

References

Moyle District Council elections
Moyle